The French ironclad Colbert was the lead ship of the s that were built for the French Navy in the 1870s. The ship was the flagship of the Mediterranean Squadron for most of her career. She took part in the French conquest of Tunisia, notably shelling and landing troops in Sfax on 15–16 July 1881. Colbert was paid off in 1895 and condemned in 1900. The ship was finally sold for scrap in 1909.

Design and description
The Colbert-class ships were designed by Constructor Sabattier as improved versions of the ironclad . As a central battery ironclad, Colbert had her armament concentrated amidships. Like most ironclads of her era she was equipped with a plough-shaped ram. Her crew numbered 774 officers and men. The metacentric height of the ship was low, a little above .

Propulsion
Colbert reverted to a single propeller shaft to improve her sailing qualities. She had one Wolf 3-cylinder horizontal return connecting rod compound steam engine. On sea trials the engine produced  and Colbert reached .

Armament
Colbert had two  guns mounted in barbettes on the upper deck, one gun at the forward corners of the battery, with six additional guns on the battery deck below the barbettes. The side of the upper deck were cut away to improve the ability of the barbette guns to bear fore and aft. One  was mounted in the forecastle as a chase gun. The ship's secondary armament consisted of six  guns, four forward of the battery and two aft. These latter two guns were replaced in 1878 by another 240-millimeter gun as a stern chaser. The ship also mounted four above-water  torpedo tubes.

All of the ship's guns could fire both solid shot and explosive shells.

At some point the ship received fourteen to eighteen  Hotchkiss 5-barrel revolving guns.

Armor

Service
Colbert was named in honor of Jean-Baptiste Colbert, Controller-General of Finances from 1665 to 1683 under King Louis XIV. She was laid down at Brest on 4 July 1870 and launched on 16 September 1875. While the exact reason for such prolonged construction time is not known, it is believed that reduction of the French Navy's budget after the Franco-Prussian War of 1870–71 and out-of-date work practices in French dockyards were likely causes. The ship began her sea trials on 23 May 1877, but became flagship of the Reserve Squadron on 31 August 1878. On 1 October 1879 she became the flagship of the Mediterranean Squadron; which post she would hold until 14 January 1890 when she was placed in reserve. Colbert  bombarded the Tunisian port of Sfax on 15–16 July 1881 as the French occupied Tunisia.

In May 1887, Colbert took part in exercises to practice convoy escort; the French Army kept significant forces in French North Africa, and these units would have to be transported back to Europe in the event of a major conflict. A squadron of cruisers and torpedo boats was tasked with intercepting the convoy. The convoy used bad weather to make the passage, as heavy seas kept the torpedo boats from going to sea.

She became flagship of the Reserve Squadron again on 12 April 1892 until she was disarmed and paid off in 1895. She was condemned on 11 August 1900, before being sold for scrap in 1909.

Notes

References

External links
 
  classe Colbert

Colbert-class ironclads
Ships built in France
1875 ships